All Inclusive is a French 2019 film directed by Fabien Onteniente.

Plot 
Jean-Paul Cisse (Frank Dubosc), suddenly appears around a group of travelers going on vacations to the beach before taking the bus. A couple recently had an argument, the wife leaves the husband alone for the trip (the trip being a prize he won for the couple), Jean Paul quickly approaches him to provide advice. The husband is focused on calling her to get her back but Jean Paul insist on leaving her alone and enjoy the trip. Next, a series of adventures and funny moments take place among the group who eventually become sort of friends. Things get intense when Jean Paul can't find his luggage and the system can't provide a private room for him. So, both recent friends move together to the suite for married couples. To avoid being kicked out from the special suite and keeping the treats coming from the hotel, they both have to appear as a gay couple to please the constant checks by the general manager who at some point tries some flirting over both. The comedy is family friendly.

All inclusive is a nice family film including comedy and things to consider for life and how you treat the ones you love. There are some similarities to the well received films Camping 1, Camping 2, and Camping 3, but the characters are different and there is no direct relationship with the series. Yet Jean Paul (Franck) is again a force of good bringing joy and kindness to everyone around, a nice movie to remember the importance of enjoying life every day and showing care to those around us.

Cast
 Franck Dubosc : Jean-Paul Cisse
 François-Xavier Demaison : Bruno Morin
 Josiane Balasko : Lulu
 Thierry Lhermitte : Edouard Laurent
 Amelle Chahbi : Sonia
 Caroline Anglade : Caroline
 Yvick Letexier : Pépito
 Camille Lavabre : Camille
 Victor Belmondo : Thibault
 Maïwenn : Paloma
 Kev Adams : The man at the airport

Production
Principal photography on the film began on 14 May 2018 and lasted until 4 July 2018 in Guadeloupe.

References

External links 
 

2019 films
Films directed by Fabien Onteniente
French comedy films
2019 comedy films
2010s English-language films
2010s French films